Otra Tocada Más (One More Gig) is the fourth studio album by the hard rock band El Tri. It was released in 1988 on WEA.

Track listing 
All tracks by Alex Lora

 "Otra Tocada Más" (One More Gig) – 3:00
 "Nocivo Para la Salud" (Harmful To Health) – 2:56
 "Gente Ignorante" (Ignorant People) – 2:44
 "Seguro de Vida" (Life Insurance) (Lora, Reni) – 3:26
 "El Maldito Ritmo" (The Cursed Rhythm) – 3:05
 "El Boogie del Sida" (AIDS Boogie) – 3:29
 "Lagrimas en la Lluvia" (Tears In The Rain) (Lora, Mancera) – 3:59
 "Sara" (Chico, Lora) – 3:44
 "Caseta de Cobro" (Toll Booth) – 4:06

Personnel 

 Alex Lora – guitar, vocals
 Rafael Salgado – harmonic
 Sergio Mancera – electric & rhythm guitar
 Arturo Labastida – sax
 Pedro Martínez – drums
 Ruben Soriano – bass
 Chela Lora - backing vocals on "Sara"

External links
www.eltri.com.mx
Otra Tocada Mas at Musicbrainz

El Tri albums
1988 albums
Warner Music Group albums